Chak Chak ( – "Drip-Drip", also Romanized as Chek Chek; also known as Chāhak-e Ardakān and Pir-e Sabz "The Green Pir") is a village in Rabatat Rural District, Kharanaq District, Ardakan County, Iran. At the 2006 census, its existence was noted, but its population was not reported.

The village consists of a pir perched beneath a towering cliff face in the desert of central Iran. It is the most sacred of the mountain shrines of Zoroastrianism. Located near the city of Ardakan, Chak Chak serves as a pilgrimage point for pious Zoroastrians.  Each year from June 14–18 many thousands of Zoroastrians from Iran, India and other countries flock to the fire temple at Pir-e Sabz. Tradition has it that pilgrims are to stop riding the moment they catch sight of the temple and complete the last leg of their journey on foot.

In Zoroastrian belief, Chak Chak is where Nikbanou, second daughter of the last pre-Islamic Persian ruler, Yazdegerd III of the Sassanid Empire, was cornered by the invading Arab army in 640 CE. Fearing capture Nikbanou prayed to Ahura Mazda to protect her from her enemies. In response to Nikbanou's pleadings, the mountain miraculously opened up and sheltered her from the invaders.

Notable features of Chak Chak include the ever-dripping spring located at the mountain. Legend has it that these drops are tears of grief that the mountain sheds in remembrance of Nikbanou. Growing beside the holy spring is an immense and ancient tree said to be Nikbanou's cane. Legend also has it that a petrified colorful cloth from Nikbanou was also visible in the rocks, although pilgrims have since removed it.

The actual temple of Chak Chak is a man-made grotto sheltered by two large bronze doors.  The shrine enclosure is floored with marble and its walls are darkened by fires kept eternally burning in the sanctuary. In the cliffs below the shrine are several roofed pavilions constructed to accommodate pilgrims.

Gallery

References

External links

Articles about Chak Chak
 Ali Attar, Pir-e Sabz, in Persian, Jadid Online, 2007, .A slide show of Pir-e Sabz:  (4 min 43 sec).

Populated places in Iran
Zoroastrianism in Iran
Shrines in Iran